Banning is an English and German surname. Notable people with the surname include:

Non fictional
Edwin T. Banning (1864–1940), an American architect
Émile Banning (1836-1898), a Belgian civil servant
Henry B. Banning (1836-1881), an American Civil War general and Congressional Representative
James Banning (1900-1933), an American aviation pioneer
Jan Banning (born 1954), a Dutch photographer and artist
Jim Banning (1865–1952), a catcher in American Major League Baseball
Joanne Banning (born 1977), an Australian field hockey player
Lance Banning (1942–2006), an American historian
Leonard Banning (1910-unk), a British broadcaster
Leslie Banning (born 1930), an American film actress
Lex Banning (1921–1965), an Australian lyric poet
Margaret Culkin Banning (1891–1982), an American author
Mary Elizabeth Banning (1822-1903), an American mycologist and botanical illustrator
Phineas Banning (1830-1885), an American businessman
Willem Banning (1888-1971), a Dutch politician

Fictional
Banning, a surname used in the 1960s television show Days of Our Lives
Peter Banning, a character in the 1991 film Hook
Mike Banning, a character name in the 1967 American film Banning
Mike banning, a character name in the sequel Olympus Has Fallen, London Has Fallen and Angel Has Fallen.

See also
Banning (disambiguation)